Shehee is a surname. Notable people with the surname include:

 Rashaan Shehee (born 1975), American football player
 Virginia Shehee (1923–2015), American businesswoman, civic leader, and patron of the arts

See also
 Resler v. Shehee
 Shehee Stadium
 Sheheen